Nicole Mariana Bahls (born November 15, 1985) is a Brazilian model, actress and television presenter.

Career
Nicole Bahls came to fame winning a beauty contest of the sports news Globo Esporte (Rede Globo), called "Musa do Brasileirão", where women represented a football team from Brazil. Nicole was contestant for Paraná Clube.

She achieved further fame debuting as panicat in 2009. In 2011, Nicole was fired by the show's producers after public fights with her fellow panicat Juliana Salimeni, who was also fired.

In 2010, Nicole did a nude photoshoot for the Brazilian edition of Playboy magazine, being on the cover of the October issue.

In April 2013, Bahls was hired by Band and she joined the Pânico na Band. She worked as a member of the main cast and served as a reporter for the comedy television show, but in early 2015 it was confirmed that she was out.

A Fazenda
On May 29, 2012, Nicole Bahls was officially announced as one of the sixteen celebrity contestants on the fifth season of A Fazenda, the Brazilian version of reality series The Farm, which aired on Rede Record.

On August 26, 2012, after 90 days, she was evicted from the show against eventual winner Viviane Araújo, finishing in fourth place, in the most anticipated eviction of the season, which was billed by many viewers and critics the "real final" of the season.

Biography
Bahls was born in Londrina, Paraná. She is the daughter of Vera and Sérgio Bahls, a businessman and director of Rede Sanepar.

On February 1, 2016, she assumed an engagement with the model Marcelo Bimbi.

Filmography

Television

Film

References

External links

Nicole Bahls on Band.com.br
Nicole Bahls on R7.com
 
 
 

1985 births
Living people
People from Londrina
Brazilian people of German descent
Brazilian female models
Brazilian television presenters
The Farm (TV series) contestants
Brazilian models of German descent
Brazilian women television presenters